Texas Jack is a 1935 American Western film directed by Bernard B. Ray and starring Jack Perrin, Jayne Regan and Nelson McDowell.

Partial cast
 Jack Perrin as Texas Jack Carrol  
 Jayne Regan as Ann Hall  
 Nelson McDowell as Barney  
 Robert D. Walker as Dan Corey, aka Andrew Cole  
 Cope Borden as Skinny, the boy  
 Lew Meehan as Henchman Biff Jones  
 Blackie Whiteford as Henchman Cal  
 Budd Buster as Chief Kickapoo 
 Oscar Gahan as Tuck, A Minstrel 
 Jim Oates as Nip, A Minstrel

References

Bibliography
 Pitts, Michael R. Poverty Row Studios, 1929–1940: An Illustrated History of 55 Independent Film Companies, with a Filmography for Each. McFarland & Company, 2005.

External links
 

1935 films
1935 Western (genre) films
American Western (genre) films
Films directed by Bernard B. Ray
Reliable Pictures films
American black-and-white films
1930s English-language films
1930s American films